Michael H. Darnell (born 1962) is an American television executive and former child actor. He is currently the president of unscripted and alternative television at Warner Bros. He spent nearly 19 years at the FOX network as president of alternative entertainment, overseeing the network's reality television division during the genre's rise. In 2017, Preston Beckman, a former FOX executive who writes under the pseudonym The Masked Scheduler, called Darnell "the king of reality TV and one of the more interesting, offbeat characters ever to occupy an executive suite."

Early life and career
Mike Darnell was born in Philadelphia, Pennsylvania, to Eileen and Doyle E. Darnell. His father was a policeman, and Darnell was raised and attended public school in Philly's Northeast section. When he was 10, a talent manager saw him singing at a Police Athletic League event and encouraged him to do commercials. When he was 12, his family moved to California, where he eventually appeared in, or voiced-over, some sixty commercials. He also appeared in TV episodes such as Sanford and Son, Welcome Back, Kotter and Kojak.  Later he worked as a bank teller to help pay his way through Cal State-Northridge. He also played piano at a night spot. Soon after graduating, he had an internship at Entertainment Tonight, which he says he "hated", before he started working at Fox's West Coast flagship station KTTV, within their news department.

Darnell is married to Carolyn Oberman, a public relations executive who works for the Emmy Awards, and they have a daughter. , he lives in Calabasas, California.

Fox Broadcasting Company
Darnell became an executive at Fox in 1994, initially under the title "director of specials." One of his first that came to broad attention was in 1995, when a producer brought Darnell black-and-white footage that appeared to portray an alien being dissected. As the network feared accusations of propagating a hoax, the show was broadcast with the title Alien Autopsy: Fact or Fiction; it drew an audience of nearly twelve million viewers and was rebroadcast several more times. At one point, he produced over sixty specials a year for Fox, including: When Animals Attack!, World's Wildest Police Videos, Breaking the Magician's Code: Magic's Biggest Secrets Finally Revealed, and Man vs Beast. Darnell's projects were known for their often lurid and controversial nature, leading The New York Times to call him "Fox's point man for perversity" in 2000. 

Series that Darnell was involved with for included American Idol, Hell’s Kitchen, MasterChef, So You Think You Can Dance, The X Factor, Kitchen Nightmares, Are You Smarter Than a 5th Grader?, Temptation Island, The Simple Life, My Big Fat Obnoxious Fiancé, Joe Millionaire, and the launch of the animated series Futurama and Family Guy. With more than thirty million viewers at its peak, American Idol helped FOX rise from the last place network to eight consecutive seasons as the number one network. Darnell oversaw American Idol from its creation through its twelfth season. Darnell told Variety that his proudest achievements during his time at FOX included American Idol, the success he had with Gordon Ramsay, and the season finale of Joe Millionaire, which drew about forty million viewers, outranking that year's Academy Awards, and became the network's most-viewed entertainment telecast.

Warner Bros Television
In 2013, Darnell left Fox and began heading up the Unscripted & Alternative division at Warner Bros. where he is responsible for overseeing development and current programming for alternative broadcast series, high-end documentaries, unscripted streaming and cable series, and first-run syndication. In 2017, Darnell and his team oversaw 35 series across 20 different networks, including primetime series such as Ellen’s Game of Games (NBC), The Voice (NBC), The Bachelor franchise (ABC), Mental Samurai (FOX), The Real, and The Ellen DeGeneres Show, among others. That same year, Deadline reported that in Darnell's first four years at Warner Bros, the studio had twelve unscripted series airing in primetime, more than any of its rivals.

Darnell created and produced talent competition series The World's Best on CBS hosted by James Corden. The series was produced by Darnell and his Warner Horizon Unscripted Television division in association with Mark Burnett and MGM Television and Ben Winston and Fulwell 73.

Darnell also created and executive produced the competition series Mental Samurai on Fox hosted by Rob Lowe. The series is produced by Darnell and his Warner Horizon Unscripted Television division in association with Arthur Smith and A. Smith & Co. Productions and Jeff Apploff and Apploff Entertainment.

References

External links
 "Mike Darnell on ‘Little Big Shots,’ ‘The Bachelor,’ Ellen DeGeneres and ‘Love Connection’" April 3, 2017

1962 births
20th-century American businesspeople
20th-century American male actors
21st-century American businesspeople
American male child actors
American television executives
California State University, Northridge alumni
Fox Broadcasting Company executives
Living people
Male actors from Philadelphia
People from Calabasas, California
Warner Bros. people